Prune Nourry is a French multidisciplinary artist currently working at the Invisible Dog Art Center in Brooklyn, NY.

Specialized in sculpture, she also explores a multitude of media notably through installations that include photography, film and performance.

Prune works on topics ranging from bioethics to women's rights and gender. She brings attention to some of the preoccupying issues that arise from fast-growing scientific discoveries such as sex selection, artificial procreation, and genetic engineering.

Biography 
Nourry was born in Paris, France in 1985. She received a degree in wood sculpture from the École Boulle in Paris, and began her career as independent multidisciplinary artist at the end of her final year at the school. She has been an artist-in-residence at the Invisible Dog Art Center in Brooklyn, NY since 2011.

She is married to the artist JR.

In 2016, at age 31, she was diagnosed with breast cancer, and by 2019 had undergone a mastectomy. She made a non-fiction film about these experiences called Serendipity. As of 2018, she was in remission.

Selected exhibitions and performances

Conferences and lectures

References

 Kourlas, Gia "Art at the Food Cart and in the Park", The New York Times, New York, September 20, 2011.
 Tripathi, Shailaja "The Cow Girl", The Hindu, September 25, 2010.
 Tripathi, Shailaja "The Cow Girl", The Hindu, September 25, 2010.
 Genestar, Edouard "Prune, Une Sacrée Artiste", Polka Magazine, France, March 2011.
 Tripathi, Shailaja "The Cow Girl", The Hindu, September 25, 2010.
 Marcum, Anna "A Visit to the Sperm Bar", The Eye, Columbia Spectator, New York, October 6, 2011.
 Marcum, Anna "A Visit to the Sperm Bar", The Eye, Columbia Spectator, New York, October 6, 2011.
 Rolin, Gaelle "Les filles sacrées de prune Nourry", Madame Figaro, France, 2011.
 Prune Nourry archive The Invisible Dog
 "China Terracotta Artist", CNN, 2013
 Les Terracotta Daughters de Prune Nourry à Paris, Madame Figaro, 22 mars 201
 L'armée des filles de Prune Nourry au 104 archive FranceTvInfo, 4 avril 201
 "Prune Nourry et l'Armée des filles", Elle Magazine, Mars 2016

Videos 
 Terracotta Daughters, Trailer
 Imbalance, Chinatown
 Holy River, Procession
 Holy Holi
 Holy Daughters, Exhibition View
 The Procreative Dinner

External links
 Official website| https://www.prunenourry.com/
 Vimeo

French artists
Living people
1985 births
French contemporary artists